The Lumières Award for Most Promising Actor is a French annual award presented by the Académie des Lumières since 2000.

Winners and nominees
Winners are listed first with a blue background, followed by the other nominees.

2000s

2010s

2020s

See also
César Award for Most Promising Actor

External links 
 Lumières Award for Most Promising Actor at AlloCiné

Promising Actor

Awards for young actors